Track and field is one of the sports at the quadrennial Military World Games competition. Track and field competitions have been held at every one of the eleven editions of the Military World Games, which was inaugurated in 1995.

Editions

Games records

Men

Women

See also
International athletics championships and games

References

External links
Past champions from GBR Athletics

 
Military World Games